Đorđe Denić (born 1 April 1996) is a Serbian professional footballer who plays as a midfielder. He has played for Rad, Žarkovo, Rosenborg, Apollon Limassol and Atromitos.

Club career

Rad
Denić made his professional debut for Rad on 1 September 2013, in a SuperLiga match against Partizan at their stadium. He was substituted in for Andrija Luković in 80th minute, after which Rad lost 3-1. He was loaned to Žarkovo on dual registration until the end of first half the 2015–16 season.

Rosenborg
Denić signed for Norwegian side Rosenborg on 13 August 2018 on a three and a half-year contract.

Career statistics

Club

References

External links
 
 Đorđe Denić stats at utakmica.rs
 
 

1996 births
Living people
Footballers from Belgrade
Serbian footballers
Serbia under-21 international footballers
Serbia youth international footballers
Serbian expatriate footballers
Association football midfielders
FK Rad players
Rosenborg BK players
Serbian SuperLiga players
Eliteserien players
Expatriate footballers in Norway